The 2015–16 New Orleans Pelicans season was the 14th season of the franchise in the National Basketball Association (NBA). The team failed to post a second consecutive winning season and missed the playoffs. Following the season, tragedy struck as Bryce Dejean-Jones was shot dead while shouting for his girlfriend for his daughter's first birthday at the Dallas apartment. Dejean-Jones death was the first for an active NBA player since Eddie Griffin, who died in a car accident in 2007.

Draft

Roster

Roster Notes
 Bryce Dejean-Jones died due to a gunshot wound on May 28.

Standing

By Division

By Conference

Pre-season

|- style="background:#cfc;"
| 1 
| October 3
| @ Indiana
| 110–105
| Anthony Davis (18)
| Anderson, Davis (8)
| Babbitt, Cole, Webster (3)
| Bankers Life Fieldhouse13,725
| 1–0
|- style="background:#fbb;"
| 2 
| October 9
| Atlanta
| 93–103
| Anthony Davis (20)
| Kendrick Perkins (6)
| Norris Cole (3)
| Veterans Memorial Arena7,628
| 1–1
|- style="background:#cfc;"
| 3 
| October 12
| @ Chicago
| 123–115
| Anthony Davis (26)
| Ryan Anderson (10)
| Luke Babbitt (4)
| United Center21,407
| 2–1
|- style="background:#fbb;"
| 4 
| October 17
| Sacramento
| 98–107
| Ryan Anderson (20)
| Adrien, Davis (8)
| Holiday, Robinson (4)
| Rupp Arena19,183
| 2–2
|- style="background:#fbb;"
| 5 
| October 19
| @ Houston
| 100–120
| Ryan Anderson (23)
| Ryan Anderson (11)
| Holiday, Robinson (5)
| Toyota Center16,678
| 2–3
|- style="background:#fbb;"
| 6 
| October 21
| @ Orlando
| 107–110 OT
| Anthony Davis (33)
| Anthony Davis (16)
| Gee, Gordon, Jones (2)
| Amway Center12,779
| 2–4
|- style="background:#cfc;"
| 7 
| October 23
| Miami
| 93–90
| Anthony Davis (25)
| Anthony Davis (13) 
| Anthony Davis (5)
| Smoothie King Center16,478
| 3–4

Regular season game log

|- style="background:#fbb;"
| 1
| October 27
| @ Golden State
| 
| Anthony Davis (18)
| Anderson, Davis (6)
| Ish Smith (9)
| Oracle Arena19,596
| 0–1
|- style="background:#fbb;"
| 2
| October 28
| @ Portland
| 
| Anthony Davis (25)
| Anthony Davis (10)
| Ish Smith (8)
| Moda Center19,393
| 0–2
|- style="background:#fbb;"
| 3
| October 31
| Golden State
|  
| Anthony Davis (26)
| Anthony Davis (15) 
| Jrue Holiday (6)
| Smoothie King Center18,406
| 0–3

|- style="background:#fbb;"
| 4
| November 3
| Orlando
| 
| Eric Gordon (24)
| Anthony Davis (9)
| Ish Smith (7)
| Smoothie King Center16,876
| 0–4
|- style="background:#fbb;"
| 5
| November 6
| Atlanta
| 
| Anthony Davis (43)
| Anthony Davis (10)
| Ish Smith (11)
| Smoothie King Center16,876
| 0–5
|- style="background:#fbb;"
| 6
| November 7
| @ Dallas
| 
| Anthony Davis (25)
| Ryan Anderson (9)
| Ish Smith (7)
| American Airlines Center20,454
| 0–6
|- style="background:#bfb;"
| 7
| November 10
| Dallas
| 
| Ryan Anderson (25)
| Ryan Anderson (7)
| Ish Smith (12)
| Smoothie King Center17,128
| 1–6
|- style="background:#fbb;"
| 8
| November 11
| @ Atlanta
| 
| Eric Gordon (26)
| Ryan Anderson (11)
| Ish Smith (10)
| Philips Arena15,597
| 1–7
|- style="background:#fbb;"
| 9
| November 13
| @ Toronto
| 
| Eric Gordon (30)
| Alexis Ajinça (9)
| Ish Smith (4)
| Air Canada Centre19,800
| 1–8
|- style="background:#fbb;"
| 10
| November 15
| @ New York
| 
| Anthony Davis (36)
| Anthony Davis (11)
| Ish Smith (5)
| Madison Square Garden19,812
| 1–9
|- style="background:#fbb;"
| 11
| November 17
| Denver
| 
| Ryan Anderson (21)
| Luke Babbitt (7)
| Ish Smith (8)
| Smoothie King Center17,269
| 1–10
|- style="background:#fbb;"
| 12
| November 18
| @ Oklahoma City
| 
| Ryan Anderson (30)
| Alexis Ajinca (10)
| Ish Smith (6)
| Chesapeake Energy Arena18,203
| 1–11
|- style="background:#bfb;"
| 13
| November 20
| San Antonio
| 
| Ryan Anderson (30)
| Anthony Davis (18)
| Ish Smith (13)
| Smoothie King Center16,698
| 2–11
|- style="background:#bfb;"
| 14
| November 22
| Phoenix
| 
| Anthony Davis (32)
| Anthony Davis (19)
| Ish Smith (8)
| Smoothie King Center16,698
| 3–11
|- style="background:#bfb;"
| 15
| November 25
| @ Phoenix
| 
| Anthony Davis (26)
| Anthony Davis (17)
| Ish Smith (11)
| Talking Stick Resort Arena16,338
| 4–11
|- style="background:#fbb;"
| 16
| November 27
| @ L. A. Clippers
| 
| Anthony Davis (17)
| Ömer Aşık (10)
| Ish Smith (10)
| Talking Stick Resort Arena16,338
| 4–12
|- style="background:#fbb;"
| 17
| November 28
| @ Utah
| 
| Anthony Davis (36)
| Anthony Davis (11)
| Ish Smith (6)
| Vivint Smart Home Arena19,911
| 4–13

|- style="background:#fbb;"
| 18
| December 1
| Memphis
| 
| Tyreke Evans (20)
| Anthony Davis (14)
| Tyreke Evans (10)
| Smoothie King Center16,698
| 4–14
|- style="background:#fbb;"
| 19
| December 2
| @ Houston
| 
| Anthony Davis (29)
| Anthony Davis (13)
| Tyreke Evans (8)
| Toyota Center17,339
| 4–15
|- style="background:#bfb;"
| 20
| December 4
| Cleveland
| 
| Anthony Davis (31)
| Anthony Davis (12)
| Tyreke Evans (10) 
| Smoothie King Center17,906
| 5–15
|- style="background:#fbb;"
| 21
| December 7
| Boston
| 
| Ryan Anderson (18)
| Anderson, Ajinca (9)
| Jrue Holiday (6) 
| Smoothie King Center15,715
| 5–16
|- style="background:#bfb;"
| 22
| December 11
| Washington
| 
| Tyreke Evans (27)
| Anthony Davis (11)
| Jrue Holiday (6) 
| Smoothie King Center16,875
| 6–16
|- style="background:#fbb;"
| 23
| December 12
| @ Chicago
| 
| Tyreke Evans (22)
| Anthony Davis (13)
| Tyreke Evans (6) 
| United Center21,605
| 6–17
|- style="background:#fbb;"
| 24
| December 14
| @ Portland
| 
| Anthony Davis (28)
| Tyreke Evans (12)
| Tyreke Evans (5) 
| Moda Center19,231
| 6–18
|- style="background:#bfb;"
| 25
| December 16
| @ Utah
| 
| Ryan Anderson (24)
| Anthony Davis (13)
| Tyreke Evans (5)
| Vivint Smart Home Arena17,899
| 7–18
|- style="background:#fbb;"
| 26
| December 18
| @ Phoenix
| 
| Anthony Davis (16)
| Anthony Davis (12)
| Jrue Holiday (4)
| Talking Stick Resort Arena17,227
| 7–19
|- style="background:#bfb;"
| 27
| December 20
| @ Denver
| 
| Anthony Davis (27)
| Tyreke Evans (8)
| Tyreke Evans (10)
| Pepsi Center13,857
| 8–19
|- style="background:#bfb;"
| 28
| December 23
| Portland
| 
| Anthony Davis (28)
| Anthony Davis (12)
| Tyreke Evans (9) 
| Smoothie King Center16,886
| 9–19
|- style="background:#fbb;"
| 29
| December 25
| @ Miami
| 
| Anthony Davis (29)
| Anthony Davis (15)
| Tyreke Evans (7) 
| AmericanAirlines19,845
| 9–20
|- style="background:#bfb;"
| 30
| December 26
| Houston
| 
| Anthony Davis (24)
| Anthony Davis (13)
| Tyreke Evans (13) 
| Smoothie King Center18,248
| 10–20
|- style="background:#fbb;"
| 31
| December 28
| Orlando
| 
| Anthony Davis (20)
| Cole, Davis (8) 
| Tyreke Evans (8) 
| Amway Center17,606
| 10–21
|- style="background:#fbb;"
| 32
| December 31
| L. A. Clippers
| 
| Ryan Anderson (17)
| Anthony Davis (15)
| Tyreke Evans (9)  
| Smoothie King Center16,920
| 10–22

|- style="background:#bfb;"
| 33
| January 2
| @ Dallas
| 
| Anthony Davis (31)
| Anthony Davis (14)
| Jrue Holiday (5)
| American Airlines Center20,152
| 11–22
|- style="background:#fbb;"
| 34
| January 6
| Dallas
| 
| Anthony Davis (26)
| Anthony Davis (12)
| Anthony Davis (7)
| CenturyLink Center15,255
| 11–23
|- style="background:#fbb;"
| 35
| January 8
| Indiana
| 
| Tyreke Evans (27) 
| Alexis Ajinça (10)
| Tyreke Evans (5) 
| CenturyLink Center16,895
| 11–24
|- style="background:#fbb;"
| 36
| January 10
| @ L. A. Clippers
| 
| Tyreke Evans (27) 
| Aşık, Holiday (11)
| Tyreke Evans (7) 
| STAPLES Center19,060
| 11–25
|- style="background:#fbb;"
| 37
| January 12
| @ L. A. Lakers
| 
| Tyreke Evans (21)
| Ömer Aşık (13)
| Cole, Evans, Holiday (4)
| Staples Center18,997
| 11–26
|- style="background:#bfb;"
| 38
| January 13
| @ Sacramento
| 
| Davis, Gordon (24)
| Ömer Aşık (13)
| Jrue Holiday (10)
| Sleep Train Arena18,997
| 12–26
|- style="background:#bfb;"
| 39
| January 15
| Charlotte
| 
| Ryan Anderson (32)
| Alonzo Gee (9)
| Jrue Holiday (10)
| Smoothie King Center16,876
| 13–26
|- style="background:#fbb;"
| 40
| January 18
| @ Memphis
| 
| Jrue Holiday (23)
| Anthony Davis (8)
| Jrue Holiday (9)
| FedEx Forum18,119
| 13–27
|- style="background:#bfb;"
| 41
| January 19
| Minnesota
| 
| Anthony Davis (35)
| Ömer Aşık (8)
| Jrue Holiday (9)
| Smoothie King Center14,255
| 14–27
|- style="background:#bfb;"
| 42
| January 21
| Detroit
| 
| Anthony Davis (32)
| Alonzo Gee (9)
| Tyreke Evans (10)
| Smoothie King Center15,281
| 15–27
|- style="background:#bfb;"
| 43
| January 23
| Milwaukee
| 
| Ryan Anderson (23)
| Ömer Aşık (8)
| Jrue Holiday (9)
| Smoothie King Center16,980
| 16–27
|- style="background:#fbb;"
| 44
| January 25
| Houston
| 
| Jrue Holiday (32)
| Alonzo Gee (10)
| Jrue Holiday (9)
| Smoothie King Center15,688
| 16–28
|- style="background:#bfb;"
| 45
| January 28
| Sacramento
| 
| Ryan Anderson (36)
| Ömer Aşık (13) 
| Norris Cole (10)
| Smoothie King Center15,636
| 17–28
|- style="background:#bfb;"
| 46
| January 30
| Brooklyn
| 
| Jrue Holiday (26)
| Anthony Davis (16)
| Jrue Holiday (7)
| Smoothie King Center18,037
| 18–28

|- style="background:#fbb;"
| 47
| February 1
| Memphis
|  
| Cole, Davis (23)
| Anthony Davis (9)
| Norris Cole (6)
| Smoothie King Center15,210
| 18–29
|- style="background:#fbb;"
| 48
| February 3
| @ San Antonio
| 
| Anthony Davis (28)
| Ömer Aşık (11)
| Norris Cole (9)
| AT&T Center18,418
| 18–30
|- style="background:#fbb;"
| 49
| February 4
| L. A. Lakers
| 
| Anthony Davis (39)
| Anthony Davis (11)
| Jrue Holiday (9)
| Smoothie King Center18,420
| 18–31
|- style="background:#fbb;"
| 50
| February 6
| @ Cleveland
| 
| Norris Cole (26)
| Ömer Aşık (12)
| Norris Cole (5)
| Quicken Loans Arena20,562
| 18–32
|- style="background:#bfb;"
| 51
| February 8
| @ Minnesota
|  
| Anthony Davis (27)
| Aşık, Davis (8) 
| Norris Cole (6)
| Target Center11,926
| 19–32
|- style="background:#bfb;"
| 52
| February 10
| Utah
|  
| Jrue Holiday (21)
| Alexis Ajinca (11)
| Jrue Holiday (9)
| Smoothie King Center15,256
| 20–32
|- style="background:#fbb;"
| 53
| February 11
| @ Oklahoma City
| 
| Davis, Holiday (23)
| Anderson, Cole (5)
| Norris Cole (6)
| Chesapeake Energy Arena18,203
| 20–33
|- style="text-align:center;"
| colspan="9" style="background:#bbcaff;"|All-Star Break
|- style="background:#bfb;"
| 54
| February 19
| Philadelphia
| 
| Davis, Holiday (34)
| Ömer Aşık (14)
| Jrue Holiday (12)
| Smoothie King Center16,953
| 21–33
|- style="background:#bfb;"
| 55
| February 21
| @ Detroit
| 
| Anthony Davis (59)
| Anthony Davis (20)
| Jrue Holiday (9)
| Palace of Auburn Hills17,886
| 22–33
|- style="background:#fbb;"
| 56
| February 23
| @ Washington
| 
| Jrue Holiday (20)
| Anthony Davis (20)
| Jrue Holiday (7)
| Verizon Center15,743
| 22–34
|- style="background:#bfb;"
| 57
| February 25
| Oklahoma City
| 
| Anthony Davis (30)
| Alexis Ajinca (7)
| Jrue Holiday (9)
| Smoothie King Center16,974
| 23–34
|- style="background:#fbb;"
| 58
| February 27
| Minnesota
| 
| Anderson, Gordon (31)
| Ryan Anderson (14)
| Jrue Holiday (8)
| Smoothie King Center17,338
| 23–35

|- style="background:#fbb;"
| 59
| March 2
| @ Houston
|  
| Norris Cole (21)
| Ryan Anderson (10)
| Cole, Holiday (8)
| Toyota Center18,226
| 23–36
|- style="background:#fbb;"
| 60
| March 3
| San Antonio
| 
| Eric Gordon (23)
| Anthony Davis (13)
| Jrue Holiday (7)
| Smoothie King Center17,781
| 23–37
|- style="background:#fbb;"
| 61
| March 5
| Utah
| 
| Anthony Davis (29)
| Anthony Davis (11)
| Jrue Holiday (7)
| Smoothie King Center16,680
| 23–38
|- style="background:#bfb;"
| 62
| March 7
| Sacramento
| 
| Anthony Davis (31)
| Anthony Davis (10)
| Jrue Holiday (10)
| Smoothie King Center16,403
| 24–38
|- style="background:#fbb;"
| 63
| March 9
| @ Charlotte
| 
| Anthony Davis (40)
| Anthony Davis (13)
| Jrue Holiday (6)
| Time Warner Cable Arena16,335
| 24–39
|- style="background:#fbb;"
| 64
| March 11
| @ Memphis
| 
| Jrue Holiday (34)
| Anthony Davis (13)
| Jrue Holiday (10)
| FedExForum18,119
| 24–40
|- style="background:#fbb;"
| 65
| March 12
| @ Milwaukee
| 
| Anthony Davis (29)
| Anthony Davis (11)
| Douglas, Gee, Holiday (4)
| BMO Harris Bradley Center16,518
| 24–41
|- style="background:#fbb;"
| 66
| March 14
| @ Golden State
| 
| Davis, Douglas (22)
| Anthony Davis (11)
| Toney Douglas (6)
| Oracle Arena19,596
| 24–42
|- style="background:#bfb;"
| 67
| March 16
| @ Sacramento
| 
| Ryan Anderson (29)
| Anthony Davis (14)
| Tim Frazier (9)
| Sleep Train Arena17,086
| 25–42
|- style="background:#fbb;"
| 68
| March 18
| Portland
| 
| Anderson, Holiday (30)
| Dante Cunningham (7)
| Douglas, Holiday (6)
| Smoothie King Center17,263
| 25–43
|- style="background:#bfb;"
| 69
| March 20
| L. A. Clippers
| 
| Jrue Holiday (22)
| Ömer Aşık (10)
| Jrue Holiday (8)
| Smoothie King Center17,407
| 26–43
|- style="background:#fbb;"
| 70
| March 22
| Miami
| 
| Jrue Holiday (24)
| Aşık, Douglas (9)
| Jrue Holiday (7)
| Smoothie King Center16,867
| 26–44
|- style="background:#fbb;"
| 71
| March 24
| @ Indiana
| 
| Alexis Ajinca (22)
| Ömer Aşık (15)
| Tim Frazier (5)
| Bankers Life Fieldhouse17,517
| 26–45
|- style="background:#fbb;"
| 72
| March 26
| Toronto
| 
| Alonzo Gee (18)
| Alonzo Gee (8)
| Tim Frazier (6)
| Smoothie King Center17,009
| 26–46
|- style="background:#bfb;"
| 73
| March 28
| New York
| 
| Jrue Holiday (22)
| Kendrick Perkins (8)
| Jrue Holiday (6)
| Smoothie King Center17,000
| 27–46
|- style="background:#fbb;"
| 74
| March 30
| @ San Antonio
| 
| Alexis Ajinca (18)
| Alexis Ajinca (9)
| Tim Frazier (7)
| AT&T Center18,418
| 27–47
|- style="background:#bfb;"
| 75
| March 31
| Denver
| 
| Luke Babbitt (22)
| Luke Babbitt (10)
| Toney Douglas (10)
| Smoothie King Center16,269
| 28–47

|- style="background:#bfb;"
| 76
| April 3
| @ Brooklyn
| 
| Luke Babbitt (21)
| Jordan Hamilton (11)
| Toney Douglas (13)
| Barclays Center16,329
| 29–47
|- style="background:#fbb;"
| 77
| April 5
| @ Philadelphia
| 
| Dante Cunningham (19)
| Alexis Ajinca (10)
| Tim Frazier (9)
| Wells Fargo Center10,978
| 29–48
|- style="background:#fbb;"
| 78
| April 6
| @ Boston
| 
| Toney Douglas (19)
| Alexis Ajinca (8)
| Tim Frazier (6) 
| TD Garden18,624
| 29–49
|- style="background:#bfb;"
| 79
| April 8
| L. A. Lakers
| 
| Alexis Ajinca (28)
| Alexis Ajinca (15)
| Tim Frazier (12)
| Smoothie King Center18,607
| 30–49
|- style="background:#fbb;"
| 80
| April 9
| Phoenix
| 
| Toney Douglas (19)
| Luke Babbitt (9)
| Tim Frazier (7)
| Smoothie King Center16,932
| 30–50
|- style="background:#fbb;"
| 81
| April 11
| Chicago
| 
| James Ennis (29)
| Ömer Aşık (7)
| Tim Frazier (11)
| Smoothie King Center16,867
| 30–51
|- style="background:#fbb;"
| 82
| April 13
| @ Minnesota
| 
| James Ennis (28)
| Ömer Aşık (11)
| Tim Frazier (15)
| Target Center14,889
| 30–52

References

New Orleans Pelicans seasons
New Orleans Pelicans
New Orleans Pelicans
New Orleans Pelicans